Husbands is a surname which may refer to:

 Andy Husbands (born 1969), American chef, restaurateur, author and television personality
 Clifford Husbands (born 1926), former Governor-General of Barbados
 Michael Husbands (born 1983), English-born Saint Lucian association footballer
 Patrick Husbands (born 1973), Barbadian-born Canadian jockey
 Phil Husbands, English professor of computer science and artificial intelligence

See also
 Husband (surname)

English-language surnames